Transport Safety Investigation Center, is a civil transportation accident investigation board of Turkey. It is affiliated to the Ministry of Transport and Infrastructure.

References

External links 

Government agencies of Turkey
Organizations investigating aviation accidents and incidents
Rail accident investigators
Transport organizations based in Turkey

Ministry of Transport and Infrastructure (Turkey)
Transport safety organizations